R. C. Carpenter (1812–1855) was an English architect whose output consisted mainly of churches in Gothic Revival style.  He was born in Clerkenwell, London, and was educated at Charterhouse School.  His first commissions were obtained by his father, and these were for domestic properties, including Lonsdale Square in London, and in producing designs for railway companies.  However his main interest was in designing churches.

Carpenter joined the Cambridge Camden Society in 1841 and was, with A. W. N. Pugin, a keen advocate of designing churches with features taken accurately from actual Gothic predecessors.  This resulted in town churches, including St Mary Magdalene, Munster Square, London, which is described as being his "most illustrious" church, and St Paul, Brighton.

Carpenter also designed smaller country churches which shared a basically similar plan, and this plan was also used for two churches in Australia.  Carpenter restored churches and cathedrals, the latter including Chichester and St Patrick, Dublin.  He also carried out work on country houses, and designed buildings for schools, including Sherborne, Hurstpierpoint College, and Lancing College.  He died from tuberculosis at the age of 42, and was buried in Highgate Cemetery.

Key

Works

References

Bibliography

Carpenter, R. C.